North Jiangyang Road is the name of a station on the Shanghai Metro Line 3. It is the northern terminus of the line, and part of the northern extension of the line from  that opened on 18 December 2006.

It is the only station on the entire Shanghai Metro network to only have a single side platform.

References

Shanghai Metro stations in Baoshan District
Line 3, Shanghai Metro
Railway stations in China opened in 2006
Railway stations in Shanghai